The Bram Stoker Award for Best Graphic Novel is an award presented by the Horror Writers Association (HWA) for "superior achievement" in horror writing for graphic novels.

Criteria
Awards are given in each calendar year and books originally published between January 1 and December 31 of that year are eligible. The Horror Writers Association defines a graphic novel as "any trade paperback or hardcover book consisting of work of fiction in comic-book form; the work may be presented in an electronic form as well, provided the total length is equivalent to at least 48 printed pages." The work can be original or a collection of previously published issues, with the publication date of the collection determining eligibility not the individual issues. Only the author or authors of the work receive the award.

Winners and nominees
The following are the winners and nominees. Nominees who were finalists are listed under the winner for each year, respectively. 

The year of eligibility listed in the table is the year that the work was published; the ceremony when the honor was awarded happening the following year.

References

External links
 Stoker Award on the HWA web page
 Graphical listing of all Bram Stoker award winners and nominees
 

Graphic Novel
Comics awards
2011 establishments in the United States
Awards established in 2011
English-language literary awards